Bankend is a locality in the central part of Saskatchewan, Canada. Other communities in the area include Foam Lake, Ituna, Leslie, Wishart, West Bend and Leross.  Bankend is located between the Touchwood Hills and the Beaver Hills.  Bankend was a booming agricultural community in 1928, HWY 35 arrived, and four grain elevators were built.

Demographics 

Transportation
Bankend is located on Highway 35 and near the junction of Highway 35  and Highway 743.

Notable people
Henry Dayday, Saskatoon mayor was born near Bankend.

Education
 Cresswell School Division #2074 was a one-room school house which was built near Bankend, SK.

References

Designated places in Saskatchewan
Emerald No. 277, Saskatchewan
Division No. 10, Saskatchewan